Darreh Hamyaneh-ye Olya (also Romanized as Darreh Hamyāneh-ye ‘Olyā; also known as Darhamyāneh-ye Bālā and Darreh Hambāneh-ye Bālā) is a village in Komehr Rural District, in the Central District of Sepidan County, Fars Province, Iran. At the 2006 census, its population was 324, in 75 families.

References 

Populated places in Sepidan County